Chad Mansley (born 13 November 1980) is an Australian retired soccer player who played as a forward.

Club career
Mansley played junior soccer for Newcastle teams Cardiiff, Dudleigh and Adamstown.

Mansley made his debut for the Newcastle Breakers in November 1999 as a late substitute against Adelaide Force. 

In mid-2000, Mansley trialled with Watford, playing five matches during the club's preseason. In September 2000, Mansley joined Watford on a three-month contract after protracted negotiations between Newcastle Breakers and Watford. The Breakers had initially requested a  transfer fee. He played six times for the reserve team before being told by the manager Graham Taylor that he was not required, leaving in November 2000. 

He joined Leyton Orient on a free transfer in December 2000, making one league appearance as a substitute. Mansley chose to return despite reportedly being offered a contract by Leyton Orient.

On his return from England in early 2001, Mansley signed with Newcastle United. Ahead of the 2001–02 National Soccer League season, Mansley was sent out on loan to Central Coast Coasties.

Playing for Highfields Azzurri, Mansley scored the winning golden goal in the 2002 Northern New South Wales State League grand final.

In early 2004, Mansley transferred to Weston Bears. The Bears won the 2004 Northern New South Wales State League premiership but were beaten grand finalists.

International career
Mansley toured three times with the Australian Schoolboys team between 1997 and 1999.

Honours
Highfields Azzurri
Northern New South Wales State League Championship: 2002

Weston Bears
Northern New South Wales State League Premiership: 2004

Individual
Australian Sports Medal: 2000

References

External links
 Chad Mansley at Soccer Base

Living people
1980 births
Australian soccer players
Association football forwards
Newcastle Jets FC players
Leyton Orient F.C. players